Freedom Suite is an album by saxophonist David S. Ware featuring his interpretation of the Sonny Rollins composition which was recorded in 2002 and released on the AUM Fidelity label.

Reception

In his review for AllMusic, Thom Jurek said "This is a passionate piece that's passionately played; its layers of meaning are particularly evocative at the turn of the 21st century, where the very meaning of freedom is hotly debated in all cultures. This is the most masterful of interpretations".

The All About Jazz review noted "The Freedom Suite is emotionally involving the whole way through. And after these forty minutes have passed, there's a palpable sense of calm and resolution. Perhaps that's a sign that Ware has managed to pass along some of his spiritual vision". The JazzTimes review by John Litweiler commented "It's good music, and I hope Sonny Rollins feels honored by this performance".

Track listing
All compositions by Sonny Rollins
 "The Freedom Suite: Movement 1" - 7:05   
 "The Freedom Suite: Interlude" - 11:37   
 "The Freedom Suite: Movement 2" - 8:12   
 "The Freedom Suite: Movement 3" - 12:30

Personnel
David S. Ware – tenor saxophone
Matthew Shipp – piano
William Parker – bass
Guillermo E. Brown – drums

References

2002 albums
David S. Ware albums
AUM Fidelity albums